"A House for Sale" is a song written by Carl Hampton and Homer Banks and recorded by New Zealand-born singer songwriter, Mark Williams. The song was released in August 1977 as the third and final single from his third studio album, Taking It All In Stride (1977). The song peaked at number 13 on the New Zealand charts.

Track listing
 7" single (EMI – HR 571)
Side A: "A House for Sale"
Side B: "Love Is Forever"

Chart performance

References

1977 singles
1977 songs
Mark Williams (singer) songs
EMI Records singles
Songs written by Homer Banks
Songs written by Carl Hampton